Constantine the Philosopher University in Nitra is a co-educational public university in Nitra, located in southwestern Slovakia.
It is a modern educational, scientific and artistic research institution that since 1996 bears the name of one of the most important personalities in Slovak history – Byzantine missionary Saint Cyril (born Constantine, 827–869), the "Apostle to the Slavs".

UKF has five faculties and 7029 students, of which 5562 are enrolled in full-time study. The University is also attractive for foreign students. Currently (as of October 31, 2019), it is frequented by 345 students. The wide range of programs in the Bachelor’s, Master’s and Doctoral study is a key strength of the University. 
UKF is also focusing on student work and is known for numerous cultural, social, and sporting events and student activities, many of which with long traditions.

The University publishes the University magazine Náš čas and the student magazine Občas nečas.

Notable alumni 
 Zuzana Beňušková, ethnologist
 Ján Kuciak, investigative journalist

See also 
 Faculty Hospital, Nitra

References

External links 
 Official website

Educational institutions established in 1959
Education in Slovakia
Constantine the Philosopher University in Nitra
1959 establishments in Czechoslovakia
Nitra